Un commissario a Roma is an Italian television series.

Cast
Nino Manfredi: Commissario Franco Amidei
Françoise Fabian: Renata Amidei
Christine Lemler: Francesca Amidei
Barbara Scoppa: Chiara Amidei
Nadia Rinaldi: Albina
Jacques Barbot: Simone
Roberta Manfredi: Magistrato

External links
 

Italian crime television series
1993 Italian television series debuts
1993 Italian television series endings
1990s Italian television series
RAI original programming